Stylotrichium is a genus of Brazilian plants in the tribe Eupatorieae within the family Asteraceae.

 Species
 Stylotrichium corymbosum (DC.) Mattf. - Bahia
 Stylotrichium edmundoi G.M.Barroso - Bahia
 Stylotrichium glomeratum Bautista, Rodr.Oubiña & S.Ortiz - Bahia
 Stylotrichium rotundifolium Mattf. - Bahia
 Stylotrichium sucrei R.M.King & H.Rob.  - Bahia

References

Asteraceae genera
Eupatorieae
Endemic flora of Brazil